Alanguiyeh (also Romanized as Alangū’īyeh and Olangūyeh) is a village in Banestan Rural District, in the Central District of Behabad County, Yazd Province, Iran. At the 2006 census, its population was 15, in 5 families.

References 

Populated places in Behabad County